"We Can Try" is a song by Australian recording artist Paulini, taken from her debut studio album, One Determined Heart (2004). It was written by Jeneya Carr and Audius Mtawarira, who also produced the song. "We Can Try" was released physically on 4 October 2004, as the second single from the album. The song peaked at number 30 on the ARIA Singles Chart. The music video was shot in a sepia tone.

Track listing
Australian CD single
 "We Can Try" – 3:42
 "We Can Try" (Four 2 the Floor mix) – 3:43
 "Angel Eyes" (Silvertongue mix) – 4:00
 "The Live 'Idol' Medley" – 5:03

Charts

References

2004 singles
2004 songs
Columbia Records singles
Paulini songs
Song recordings produced by Audius Mtawarira
Songs written by Audius Mtawarira